Glenwood is a village in southern Alberta, Canada. It is located north of the Town of Cardston, in Cardston County. The village was named for a man named Edward Glen Wood. The founder of the village was Edward J. Wood, successor to Latter Day Saint leader Charles Ora Card, the founder of Cardston. Both Glen and Edward Wood were from Salt Lake City, Utah, and are buried in Cardston. The old name for the village was Glenwoodville until 1979.

Demographics 

In the 2016 Census of Population conducted by Statistics Canada, the Village of Glenwood recorded a population of 316 living in 107 of its 119 total private dwellings, a  change from its 2011 population of 287.

See also 
List of communities in Alberta
List of villages in Alberta

References

External links 

1961 establishments in Alberta
Cardston County
Latter-day Saint settlements in Canada
Villages in Alberta